Silchester International Investors LLP is a London-based investment management company. One of the "designated members" of the limited liability partnership was Silchester Partners Limited until 30 June 2016, which was also the predecessor of the LLP. The other "designated members" were Stephen Charles Butt, Michael John Julian Cowan and Timothy John Linehan.
The company had a subsidiary in the US as Silchester International Investors, Inc..

Silchester International Investors made £92.5 million profit (after drawing) in 2015–16 financial year.

The firm is notable for its investments. It prevented TVB's share buy back program, which the program was criticized as a mean to increase the ownership ratio of the majority shareholder, by using TVB's own financial resource.

Portfolio companies
 Asatsu-DK
 Hysan Development (9.10%)
Morrisons (15%)
Banks
 UBI Banca
 Bank of Iwate
 Concordia Financial Group (Bank of Yokohama)
 Sydbank
media
 Arnoldo Mondadori Editore
 TVB
 RTL Group
Airlines
 WestJet

References

External links
 

Private equity firms of the United Kingdom
Companies based in the City of Westminster